Machilipatnam Express (12750) is a Superfast Express operated between Bidar and Machilipatnam. It belongs to South Central Railway of Indian Railways. It takes 10 hours 58 minutes to cover  between its nodal stations.

Route 

The table shows the list of stations between the two nodal stations. The train was extended up to Bidar from 1 March 2018. From 2022, the route has been electrified till Bidar and operational. A WAP7 or WAP4 is used to haul this Superfast express 12749/50 from BIDAR to MACHELIPATNAM and back.

References 

Transport in Bidar
Transport in Machilipatnam
Express trains in India
Rail transport in Andhra Pradesh
Rail transport in Telangana